The article may be significantly expanded by the text from German wikipedia

Michael Beheim (also Michel Behaim, Beham or Behm, 1416 – c.1472) was a wandering singer from the modern-day German state Baden-Württemberg. He is an author of a number of songs and two versed chronicles,  Buch von den Wienern and Das Leben Friedrichs I von der Pfalz.

References

1416 births
1470s deaths
German male singers
German songwriters
German chroniclers
German music history
Medieval German musicians